Big Sandy & His Fly-Rite Boys is an American rockabilly and Western swing band from California composed of Robert Williams, alias Big Sandy, Ashley Kingman, Ricky McCann and Kevin Stewart. The band is known for its eclectic style, which encompasses rockabilly, Western swing, folk, bluegrass, Cajun, mariachi, rock and roll, folk rock, swing and country.

Robert Williams grew up listening to jump blues records from his parents' collection, and subsequently performed with neo-rockabilly bands in southern California in the 1980s before forming the Fly-Rite Boys band as a trio in 1988. After recording two albums as Big Sandy & the Fly-Rite Trio, the band expanded its line-up and released its official debut studio album, Jumping from 6 to 6, in 1994. Swingin' West, the band's second album, was released the following year, and featured more prominent Western swing influences than the band's debut. After releasing a more eclectic sounding album, Feelin' Kinda Lucky, in 1997, the band went on hiatus, and released the instrumental album Big Sandy Presents the Fly-Rite Boys in 1998, followed by the Big Sandy solo album Dedicated to You, a cover album consisting of R&B and doo-wop songs, before the band reunited in 1999 to record the EP Radio Favorites.

Former members include Joe Perez, Jeff West, Bobby Trimble, TK Smith, Carl Leyland, Lee Jeffriess, and Wally Hersom. The band has been inducted into the Rockabilly Hall of Fame.

Discography

Studio albums
 Jumping from 6 to 6 (Hightone Records, 1994)
 Swingin' West (Hightone, 1995)
 Feelin' Kinda Lucky (Hightone, 1997)
 Night Tide (Hightone, 2000)
 It's Time! (Yep Roc Records, 2003)
 Turntable Matinee (Yep Roc, 2006)
 What A Dream It's Been (Razor & Tie, 2013)

Other albums
 Fly Right with Big Sandy & the Fly-Rite Trio (Dionysus, 1990)
 On the Go (No Hit Records, 1993; re-released on Jeems Records, 2002)
 Big Sandy Presents the Fly-Rite Boys (Hightone, 1998)
 Dedicated to You (Big Sandy only; Hightone, 1998)
 Radio Favorites (EP; Hightone, 1999)

References

Further reading
 Entry in Bogdanov, Vladimir, Chris Woodstra, and Stephen Thomas Erlewine. All Music Guide to Country: The Definitive Guide to Country Music, pg. 62.

External links
 Official web page
 
 Turntable Matinee review at PopMatters
 Inductee in Rockabilly Hall of Fame

American bluegrass music groups
American folk musical groups
American mariachi musicians
Bluegrass music groups
Cajun musicians
Country music groups from California
Rockabilly music groups
Swing revival ensembles
Western swing musical groups